Events from the year 1735 in Scotland.

Incumbents 

 Secretary of State for Scotland: vacant

Law officers 
 Lord Advocate – Duncan Forbes
 Solicitor General for Scotland – Charles Erskine

Judiciary 
 Lord President of the Court of Session – Lord North Berwick
 Lord Justice General – Lord Ilay
 Lord Justice Clerk – Lord Grange, then Lord Milton

Events 
 8 August – Wade's Bridge, Aberfeldy, built and opened in 1733, is formally opened in the presence of General George Wade.

Births 
 17 May (bapt.) – John Brown, physician (died 1788 in London)
 20 September – James Keir, geologist, chemist and industrialist (died 1820 in West Bromwich)
 25 October – James Beattie, poet and moralist (died 1803)
 14 November – John Howie, biographer (died 1793)
 James Tassie, portrait engraver (died 1799 in London)

Deaths 
 27 February – John Arbuthnot, satirist and polymath (born 1667; died in London)

See also 

 Timeline of Scottish history

References 

 
Years of the 18th century in Scotland
Scotland
1730s in Scotland